Rip It Up was an Adelaide-based online music, entertainment, and culture website. The site focused on the local entertainment scene of Adelaide with gigs and tour guides, local arts, album reviews, interviews, food reviews and news including bars and restaurants, food trucks, openings and more.

History
Rip It Up magazine was first published in 1989 and released over 1000 issues. It was a weekly street press magazine, in Adelaide, Australia, focusing on the local entertainment scene. The magazine provided a comprehensive gig and events guide, strong local arts focus, live gigs and album reviews, interviews with local and international artists, regular columns, food news and reviews including bars and restaurants, food trucks, openings and more. Issues were released each Thursday. The publication moved to a digital-only platform on 17 April 2014.

The magazine ceased operations altogether on 30 June 2016.

Awards

Fowler's Live Music Awards
The Fowler's Live Music Awards took place from 2012 to 2014 to "recognise success and achievement over the past 12 months [and] celebrate the great diversity of original live music" in South Australia. Since 2015 they're known as the South Australian Music Awards.

 
|-
| 2013
| Rip It Up
| Favourite SA Music Media Source
| 
|- 
| 2014
| Rip It Up
| Favourite SA Music Media Source
| 
|-

References

1989 establishments in Australia
2014 disestablishments in Australia
Defunct magazines published in Australia
Local interest magazines
Magazines established in 1989
Magazines disestablished in 2014
Mass media in Adelaide
Music in Adelaide
Music magazines published in Australia
Weekly magazines published in Australia
Online magazines with defunct print editions
Online music magazines published in Australia